Marcelo Alejandro Cardozo (born 8 December 1987) is an Argentine footballer who plays as a left-back for Boca Unidos.

References

External links
 

1987 births
Living people
Argentine footballers
Argentine expatriate footballers
Association football defenders
Footballers from Buenos Aires
Club de Gimnasia y Esgrima La Plata footballers
Defensa y Justicia footballers
Godoy Cruz Antonio Tomba footballers
Aldosivi footballers
Unión de Santa Fe footballers
Juventud Unida Universitario players
Nueva Chicago footballers
Cafetaleros de Chiapas footballers
Quilmes Atlético Club footballers
Club Atlético Los Andes footballers
Boca Unidos footballers
Argentine Primera División players
Primera Nacional players
Primera B Metropolitana players
Ascenso MX players
Argentine expatriate sportspeople in Mexico
Expatriate footballers in Mexico